Twin Lakes Airport  is a privately owned, public-use airport located four miles (6 km) northwest of the central business district of Graniteville, in Aiken County, South Carolina, United States. A portion of the airport is also located in Edgefield County.

Facilities and aircraft 
For the 12-month period ending 22 May 2019, the airport had 1,500 general aviation aircraft operations, an average of 4 per day. At that time there were 52 single-engine aircraft and 3 ultra-light aircraft based at this airport.

References

External links 
 

Airports in South Carolina
Buildings and structures in Aiken County, South Carolina
Transportation in Aiken County, South Carolina